This is a list of mosques in Benin.

See also
 Religion in Benin
 Lists of mosques

 
Benin
Mosques